Kamaljit Singh (born 3 September 1994) is a German footballer who plays as a striker for Eintracht Nordhorn.

Career

Club career

Singh started his career with German sixth tier side Eintracht Nordhorn. In 2014, he signed for Union Lohne in the German seventh tier. In 2017, Singh signed for German fourth tier club Rehden. Before the second half of 2017–18, he signed for SpVgg Vreden in the German sixth tier.

In 2018, he returned to German seventh tier team Eintracht Nordhorn. Singh was the top scorer of the 2021–22 German seventh tier with 55 goals.

International career

He was the top scorer of the 2018 CONIFA World Football Cup with 6 goals.

References

External links 

 Kamaljit Singh at FuPa

1993 births
Association football forwards
BSV Schwarz-Weiß Rehden players
German footballers
German people of Indian descent
Landesliga players
Living people
Regionalliga players